Pride (Spanish: Orgullo) is a 1955 Spanish drama film directed by Manuel Mur Oti.

Cast
 Xan das Bolas
 Eduardo Calvo as Fidel
 Arturo Castro 'Bigotón'
 Francisco de Cossío
 Beni Deus
 Enrique Diosdado as Don Enrique
 Félix Fernández as Obrero
 María Francés
 Matilde Guarnerio
 Rufino Inglés
 Cándida Losada as La madre
 Julián Muñoz
 Guillermo Méndez
 Fernando Nogueras as Ramón
 Nicolás D. Perchicot
 José Prada
 Marisa Prado as Laura
 Domingo Rivas
 Alfonso Rojas
 Alberto Ruschel
 Luisa Sala
 Vicente Ávila

References

Bibliography 
 Bentley, Bernard. A Companion to Spanish Cinema. Boydell & Brewer 2008.

External links 
 

1955 drama films
Spanish drama films
1955 films
1950s Spanish-language films
Films directed by Manuel Mur Oti
Spanish black-and-white films
1950s Spanish films